USS Bristol County (LST-1198) was the last of the twenty s of the United States Navy (USN) which replaced the traditional bow door-design tank landing ships (LSTs). The LST was constructed by National Steel and Shipbuilding Company of San Diego, California. Bristol County was launched in 1971 and commissioned into the USN in 1972. Bristol County was assigned to the United States Pacific Fleet and remained in service until 1994 when it was decommissioned. Sold to Morocco that year, the vessel was recommissioned into the Royal Moroccan Navy as Sidi Mohammed Ben Abdellah. The ship remains in service.

Design and description
However, the traditional bow door form for LSTs would not be capable. Therefore, the designers of the Newport class came up with a design of a traditional ship hull with a  aluminum ramp slung over the bow supported by two derrick arms. This made the Newport class the first to depart from the standard LST design that had been developed in early World War II.

Bristol County was fitted with six Alco 16-645-ES diesel engines turning two shafts, three to each shaft. The ship was also equipped with a bow thruster to allow for better maneuvering near causeways and to hold position while offshore during the unloading of amphibious vehicles.

The Newport class were larger and faster than previous LSTs and were able to transport tanks, heavy vehicles and engineer groups and supplies that were too large for helicopters or smaller landing craft to carry. The LSTs have a ramp forward of the superstructure that connects the lower tank deck with the main deck and a passage large enough to allow access to the parking area amidships. The vessels are also equipped with a stern gate to allow the unloading of amphibious vehicles directly into the water or to unload onto a utility landing craft (LCU) or pier. At either end of the tank deck there is a  turntable that permits vehicles to turn around without having to reverse. The vessels also have davits for four vehicle and personnel landing craft (LCVPs) and could carry four pontoon causeway sections along the sides of the hull.

Bristol County was initially armed with four Mark 33 /50 caliber guns in two twin turrets. The vessel was equipped with two Mk 63 gun control fire systems (GCFS) for the 3-inch guns, but these were removed in 1977–1978. The ship also had SPS-10 surface search radar. Atop the stern gate, the vessels mounted a helicopter deck. They had a maximum complement of 213 including 11 officers.

Construction and career

United States service
The LST was ordered as the final hull of the third group of the Newport class in Fiscal Year 1967 and a contract was awarded on 15 July 1966. The ship was laid down on 13 February 1971 at San Diego, California, by the National Steel and Shipbuilding Company. Bristol County was launched on 4 December 1971 and commissioned on 5 August 1972. Bristol County was assigned to the Amphibious Force, Pacific Fleet, with the home port of Long Beach, California. The tank landing ship alternated between training operations off the west coast of the United States with deployments to the western Pacific, maintaining this cycle into 1980.

Bristol County was decommissioned and struck from the Naval Vessel Register on 29 July 1994.

Moroccan service
The ship was purchased by the Royal Moroccan Navy on 16 August 1994 through the Security Assistance Program to replace the troop transport . The LST was renamed Sidi Mohammed Ben Abdellah (407). The ship commemorates the 18th century sultan of Morocco Mohammed ben Abdallah. By late 1995, Sidi Mohammed Ben Abdallah was considered non-operational but was later returned to service. The vessel was based at Casablanca, Morocco.

Citations

References

External links

 NavSource

 

Newport-class tank landing ships
Ships built in San Diego
1971 ships
Ships transferred from the United States Navy to the Royal Moroccan Navy
Amphibious warfare vessels of the Royal Moroccan Navy
Amphibious warfare vessels of Morocco